Nicole Haynes (born September 18, 1974, in Toronto, Ontario) is a retired female track and field athlete from the United States, who competed in the heptathlon. She set a personal best at the 2000 Olympic Trials, where she placed 5th.  After 2000, she switched her athletic eligibility to her native Canada.  She subsequently won a silver medal in the 2003 Pan Am Games.  She won 1990 Mt. SAC Relays high school Heptathlon scoring 4315 for Bishop Montgomery High School.

Haynes is now a television sports reporter. She was hired in 2006 by the ABC affiliate WSYR-TV in Syracuse, NY.

She is currently a freelance reporter in Los Angeles, California, for FSN West and FSN Prime Ticket and has done freelance work for the NFL Network.

Haynes graduated from the University of Southern California in 1996 and earned her Master of Education degree from CSU Dominguez Hills in 2004.

References

External links
 
 
 

1974 births
Living people
American heptathletes
American sportswomen
Canadian heptathletes
Canadian sportswomen
Black Canadian female track and field athletes
World Athletics Championships athletes for the United States
Pan American Games bronze medalists for the United States
Athletes (track and field) at the 1999 Pan American Games
Pan American Games silver medalists for Canada
Athletes (track and field) at the 2003 Pan American Games
Athletes from Toronto
Pan American Games medalists in athletics (track and field)
Athletes (track and field) at the 2002 Commonwealth Games
Commonwealth Games competitors for Canada
World Athletics Championships athletes for Canada
USC Trojans women's track and field athletes
Medalists at the 1999 Pan American Games
Medalists at the 2003 Pan American Games